The GCC Volleyball Club Championship is a sports competition for club volleyball teams, currently held annually and organized by the Gulf Volleyball Association by the member states of the Gulf Cooperation Council.

Results
 In 1982, the competition was played in all GCC countries.
 In 1991, the competition was canceled due to Gulf War.
 In 2005, Al-Muharraq SC and Qatar had the same points in the league, so they played an extra match.
 In 2011, 2012, and 2014, the competition was played as group stages.

By Club

By Country

 
Gulf Cooperation Council